Diodercarus is a genus of ground beetles in the family Carabidae. This genus has a single species, Diodercarus arrowi. It is found in Iran, Iraq, and Saudi Arabia.

References

Trechinae